This is a list of Sites of Special Scientific Interest (SSSIs) in Northumberland, England.

English Nature, the designating body for SSSIs in England, uses the 1974-1996 county system, and this list follows the same approach. Some sites one may expect to find here could therefore be in the County Durham or Tyne and Wear lists.

For other counties, see List of SSSIs by Area of Search.

Sites

References

 
Northumberland
Sites of Special